BandWidth Street Press Magazine (or in short simply BandWidth Magazine) is a free monthly tabloid-sized music and lifestyle magazine (street press) established in March 2009 and based in Kota Kinabalu, Sabah, Malaysia. It is distributed throughout Kota Kinabalu and surrounding districts. In August 2011, the magazine expanded its territory to the Federal Territory of Labuan. The magazine is released between the 3rd to the 5th day of each month. The magazine was founded in Kota Kinabalu in March 2009 by Arthur E. Lee (former editor and publisher). Arthur E. Lee said at the time that "This magazine is a great opportunity and has a great potential to build a strong music media outlet that is supportive of the local music scene completely from the grass roots level."

In an interview with Sabah's New Sabah Times, Arthur E. Lee said that BandWidth Street Press Magazine was distributed free at major cafes, clubs, malls as well as on the web. He explained that the term Street Press is a type of publication between a magazine and a newspaper in terms of distribution, content and audience.

BandWidth Street Press Magazine relaunched itself after halting printing for a few months in August 2010 with the front cover featuring local rapper Atama and local high-profile DJ, DJ Fine China. The comeback saw a new look in the magazine's physical size and design. Instead of the previous in between an A4 and A3 paper size, the new size is currently at A5 and the paper material used before was dropped, changed to art paper. BandWidth's official website changed its URL to https://web.archive.org/web/20140309083929/http://www.bwmag.net/. The contents of the website was revamped and now includes an up-to-date news. The free to download online copy of the magazine is still available on this new website.

History
The first issue of BandWidth appeared on 14 March 2009 and featured Jiaja on the cover. Bandwidth was not officially launched until 23 May 2009 at D'Junction Fun Pub & Bistro, Kota Kinabalu, by Datuk Elron Angin, the assistant minister to the Minister of Tourism, Cultural and Environment of Sabah State, Datuk Masidi Manjun. A staggering number in attendance, over 400 patrons crowded the venue when BandWidth's Official Launch Party included live artist performances namely Andalusia, Sasuka, Jiaja, Alvin of Infinitez, Kinabalu Kings, Jin Hackman, Fingerstyle, DJ Mark D, DJ Special K, DJ Nukie D, DJ Yoe, bboys crew Xydro and it was hosted by DJ Jerone.

Distribution and Circulation
BandWidth Street Press Magazine is distributed primarily throughout music stores, entertainment venues, cafes, music schools, private colleges, music studios, shopping malls, restaurants, hair salons, medical centers, night clubs, pub & bars, district libraries, fashion boutiques and so on.

As of June 2009, the readership of BandWidth Street Press throughout its distribution area in Kota Kinabalu grew from 5,000 to 6,000 over the course of 4 months of operation.

Events
BandWidth Street Press Magazine is also one of the leading music events organiser in Kota Kinabalu. These events includes Acoustic Nite (first held at Blue Note, Shangri-La's Tanjung Aru resort in April 2009 with a second themed at Jazz held at Le Meridien's Rumba on 4 June 2010 titled Acoustic Jazz Nite 2010), Rock Out series (which saw Chapter I featuring Deja Voodoo Spells and Chapter II featuring SevenCollar T-shirt) and My Music Part I at Shenanigan's Fun Pub (where Kota Kinabalu saw performances by Lah Ahmad, The Fabulous Cats, Ezlynn, Nabil from Mentor, Marsha from Akademi Fantasia, Rehanna from One in A Million, Sleeq from Singapore).

Their first competition based event came in a form called Open Mic Nite 2010, where BandWidth is seen to be jointly organising the event with Hyatt Regency Kinabalu's Shenanigan's Fun Pub.

Events List:

1. Bandwidth's The Ultimate Band Search 2010 (dubbed TUBS10) - month of July 2010 @ Rumba (12 bands, 6 finalists, RM1,000 + Distro Republic Gifts + RM15,000 worth of recording deal, this band competition is unlike other. Forget Battle of the Bands, forget any other band competitions in Sabah - TUBS10 was invented to find the next 'it' band to be commercialized)

2. Bandwidth's Acoustic Jazz Nite 2010 - June 2010 @ Rumba (Over 180 pax entered the venue to witness performances fromRene Barrow, Appy, Meteor Crates, Quadro Forte and the 4 piece mix of Teddy Chin Jr, Daniel Mojina, Annabelle Tiu and Moses Da Silva)

3. Bandwidth's collabo with CCEP, Alibi Music & Hyatt Regency Kinabalu - MY MUSIC - May 2010 @ Shenanigan's (Over 2 nights, patrons to the event got to see some of the big names in Malaysian music performed - Nabil (mentor), Marsha (AF), Rehanna (OIAM), Lah Ahmad, Ezlynn and The Fabulous Cats)

4. Bandwidth's collabo with Shenanigan's Fun Pub & Bistro - OPEN MIC NITE series competition @ Shenanigan's which ran every 3rd Sunday of the month beginning Feb ending in May 2010 (The champion Joanna Quintin took home RM3,000 in cold hard cash. Second runner up went to Cosmic's Appy and the third place went to Jodie Gaisah each took home RM2,000 & RM1,000 respectively)

5. Bandwidth's Rock Out Chapter II -  January 2010 @ D Junction Fun Pub (Over 200 pax showed up to witness Wake Up Call, Pan_O_Rama, Goyang 72, 4AG, Donatello and the highlight for that evening, SevenCollar T-shirt)

6. Bandwidth's Rock Out Chapter I - 24 October 2009 @ Cocoon Bar & Resto (Over 150 pax enjoyed this rock showcase with 3rd Dice, Sasuka, Andalusia, Three Years Stacy and Deja Voodoo Spells)

7. Bandwidth's Official Launch Party - May 2009 @ D Junction Fun Pub (A packed house of 400 pax enjoying the night where there were performances by Fingerstyle, Jiaja, DJ Nukie D, DJ Special K, DJ Yoe, DJ Mark D, Jin Hackman, Andalusia, Alvin MY, Sasuka and Kinabalu Kings)

8. Bandwidth's Acoustic Nite 2009 - April 2009 @ Blue Note, Shangri La's Tanjung Aru Resort (A packed house of 250 strong, enjoying 5 local bands performing acoustic jazz numbers)

References

External links
Official Website
Fallen Rocks Solutions - Publisher's Website

2009 establishments in Malaysia
Free magazines
Magazines published in Malaysia
Magazines established in 2009
Mass media in Kota Kinabalu
Music magazines
English-language magazines